Maschio (Italian, 'male' or 'castle keep') is an Italian surname. People with this surname include:

Aurelius Maschio (died 1996), Italian priest and missionary in India
Francisco Maschio (born 1890s), an Argentinian horse race trainer
Humberto Maschio (born 1933), an Italian Argentine footballer
Mickaël Maschio (born 1973), a French motocross racer
Robert Maschio (born 1966), an American actor

See also

Ciao maschio, a 1978 Italian-French film
Nebbieul Maschio, a grape variety
Maschio Angioino, a castle in Naples, Italy